

Historical and architectural interest bridges

Major road and railway bridges 

See also 

 Transport in South Africa
 Numbered routes in South Africa
 Rail transport in South Africa
 Geography of South Africa
 List of rivers of South Africa
 List of crossings of the Orange River

Notes and references 
 

 Others references

Further reading

External links 

 
 
 
 

South Africa
 
Bridges
Bridges